Seticosta concava is a species of moth of the family Tortricidae. It is found in Morona-Santiago Province, Ecuador.

The wingspan is 21 mm. The basal area of the forewings is cream white with pale brownish suffusions between the veins. The remaining part of the wing is brown edged by a concave whitish line. The hindwings are cream, mixed with brownish on the periphery and with brownish grey strigulation (fine streaks).

Etymology
The species name refers to the shape of the posterior edge of the basal area of the forewings and is derived from Latin concava (meaning concave).

References

Moths described in 2004
Seticosta